The Jubilee Medal "90 Years of the Russian Militia" is a commemorative medal of the Ministry of Internal Affairs of Russia established in 2007 to commemorate the 90th anniversary of the creation of the militia (police).

Military awards and decorations of Russia